Nazar Khan may refer to:

Nazar Khan, Lorestan
Nazar Khan, West Azerbaijan